Inokuchi may refer to:

People
 Inokuchi Ariya, Japanese professor
 Ricardo Inokuchi, Brazilian table tennis player
 Yuka Inokuchi, Japanese voice actress

Places
 Inokuchi Station (Hiroshima), a railway station on Hiroden Miyajima Line in Hiroshima, Japan
 Inokuchi Station (Ishikawa), a railway station on the Hokuriku Railroad Ishikawa Line in Hakusan, Japan
 Inokuchi, Toyama, a village in Japan